JDS Miura (LST-4151) was the lead ship of the s of the Japanese Maritime Self-Defense Force. She was commissioned on 29 January 1975.

Development and design 
The Maritime Self-Defense Force's transport and landing craft unit set up a fleet in 1955 with six general-purpose landing craft (LCUs) and 29 mobile landing craft (LCMs) provided by the U.S. Navy under the MSA Agreement. And. Subsequently, in 1961, based on the MSA agreement, three LST-542 class tank landing ships (LST-1 class final type) retired by the U.S. Navy were donated and started operation as Osumi type transport ships.

The three ships of the same type formed the first transport corps under the control of the Yokosuka District Force, but on May 1, 1962, they were reassigned under the direct control of the Self-Defense Fleet and engaged in maritime transport and maritime operation transport. It was an extremely practical landing ship except for the lack of speed, but all of them were built from 1944 to 1945, and since they will reach the end of their useful life in the 40's of the Showa era, an alternative ship is needed. Was there. For this reason, the design of the 1,500-ton type (45LST), which had been built for the district corps a little earlier, was expanded, and it was built as a 2,000-ton type transport ship for agile operation under the SDF fleet.

Construction and career 
She was laid down on November 26, 1973, at the Ishikawajima Harima Tokyo No. 2 Factory as the 1972 planned transport ship No. 4151 based on the 4th Defense Force Development Plan, launched on August 13, 1975. Commissioned on January 29, 2014, it was incorporated into the 1st Transport Corps under the direct control of the Self-Defense Fleet and deployed in Yokosuka. 

They joined and arrived at the port of Sihanukville in Cambodia on October 2. Returned to Yokosuka on December 26th. 

On February 13, 1998, it was transferred to the Yokosuka District Force as a ship under direct control in place of the retired . 

She was decommissioned on April 7, 2000. The total itinerary during commissioning reached 379,719 nautical miles and 17.6 laps of the earth.

Gallery

References 

Miura-class tank landing ships
Ships built by IHI Corporation
1974 ships